Prague–Karlovy Vary–Prague was a one-day cycling race held annually between 1921 and 2010 in the Czech Republic. It was part of UCI Europe Tour in category 1.2 from 2007 until its final edition in 2010.

Winners

References

External links

Cycle races in the Czech Republic
Recurring sporting events established in 1921
1921 establishments in Czechoslovakia
Recurring sporting events disestablished in 2010
2010 disestablishments in the Czech Republic
UCI Europe Tour races
Defunct cycling races in the Czech Republic